Sounds of Nature ( 天籁 ) is a work for unconventional Instruments (seven performers),
composed by He Xuntian in 1986.

Summary
He Xuntian adopted RD Composition in his work Sounds of Nature.

The work won The Outstanding Musical Achievement Award of The International New Music Composers Competition 1989-90 USA.

Performance
Sounds of Nature, He Xuntian Symphony Works Concert 1988
Dirigent: He Xuntian
Sounds of Nature Ensemble
30. November 1988, Beijing Concert Hall, Beijing

References

Compositions by He Xuntian
Compositions for chamber orchestra
1986 compositions